Roy Lee Johnson (born December 31, 1938) is an American R&B and soul songwriter, singer and guitarist. He is best known for his composition "Mr. Moonlight", which has been covered by many artists, including The Beatles. Johnson is recognized as an influence on the bands that made up the British Invasion.

He was born in Centralhatchee, Georgia, and began playing guitar as a child.  Around 1955, he joined his first band, The Brassettes, who included Robert Ward and who played local dances in and around Hogansville.  After the band won a talent contest in Atlanta, they recorded Johnson's song, "Nobody Does Something For Nothing", for the small Stat label. In the late 1950s, Johnson moved to Ohio, joining Ward in the Ohio Untouchables.  However, by 1961 he had returned to Atlanta, and began playing in Piano Red's band, the Interns.  His song "Mister Moonlight", which he had written in high school, was first recorded by Piano Red, credited as "Dr. Feelgood and the Interns", and released in 1962 as the b-side of "Doctor Feel-Good" on OKeh 4-7144.

Johnson left the Interns in about 1963, and released his first solo record, "Too Many Tears", on OKeh that year.  Neither it nor its follow-up, a reworked "Nobody Does Something For Nothing", were successful.   However, in 1964 the Beatles covered "Mr. Moonlight" on the album Beatles for Sale (on Beatles '65 in the US), the success of which allowed Johnson to form his own band.  He recorded three singles for Columbia Records in 1966-67, including "My Best Just Ain’t Good Enough", and another single for the Josie label. Otis Redding, for whom he had previously been a support act, then introduced him to Phil Walden, who recorded three singles with him in 1968 at the FAME Studios in Muscle Shoals, featuring the studio rhythm section.  The singles included "Cheer Up, Daddy’s Coming Home" and "Take Me Back And Try Me", but again were not hits.   He then formed a new band, Roy Lee Johnson & The Villagers, who recorded a self-titled album for Stax Records in 1973, influenced by the funk style of James Brown.  However, the band broke up after the sudden death of 21-year-old bass player Michael James.

He continued to release occasional singles in the late 1970s and 1980s, setting up his own studio and continue to perform with various bands.  In the early 1990s, tracks he had recorded were released in England as the album All Night Long (Howzat LBW1).  He released another album, When a Guitar Plays the Blues, in 1998.

References

1938 births
Living people
People from Heard County, Georgia
African-American male singer-songwriters
American rhythm and blues guitarists
American male guitarists
American rhythm and blues singers
American soul singers
American rock songwriters
Stax Records artists
Guitarists from Georgia (U.S. state)
20th-century American guitarists
African-American guitarists
20th-century African-American male singers
Singer-songwriters from Georgia (U.S. state)